Alexander Viggo Jensen (born 22 June 1874 in Copenhagen, Denmark; died 2 November 1930 in Copenhagen, Denmark) was a Danish weightlifter, sport shooter, gymnast, and athlete. He was the first Danish and Nordic Olympic champion, at the 1896 Summer Olympics in Athens.

The first weightlifting event held was the two-handed lift, in a style now known as the clean and jerk. Jensen and Launceston Elliot of Great Britain and Ireland finished the competition tied at 111.5 kilograms, though the judges declared Jensen had performed the lift with better form and would be awarded first place. The British delegation protested, resulting in more attempts being given both lifters to improve their scores.  Neither did and therefore Jensen retained first place, but he had injured his shoulder in the extra attempts.

That injury hampered Jensen's efforts in the one-handed lift, the snatch.  He was able to lift only 57.0 kilograms to Elliot's 71.0 kilograms, taking second place in the event. Jensen competed in the shot put, placing fourth. He was not among the top four in the discus throw, placing sixth.

In the gymnastics competitions, Jensen entered the rope climbing event. He did not finish the climb, placing fourth behind the two Greeks who did reach the top of the 14 metre rope and Fritz Hofmann, who had gotten higher than Jensen. He was ahead of Launceston Elliot in the event.

He also competed in the two rifle events. In the military rifle, Jensen placed sixth with a score of 1,640 points and 30 hits of 40 shots. The free rifle was more successful for him, as he finished third at 1,305 points on 31 hits. His scores for each string of 10 shots were 392, 423, 280, and 210.

References

External links

1874 births
1930 deaths
Olympic athletes of Denmark
Olympic gymnasts of Denmark
Olympic shooters of Denmark
Olympic weightlifters of Denmark
Athletes (track and field) at the 1896 Summer Olympics
19th-century sportsmen
Gymnasts at the 1896 Summer Olympics
Shooters at the 1896 Summer Olympics
Shooters at the 1900 Summer Olympics
Weightlifters at the 1896 Summer Olympics
Danish male shot putters
Danish male discus throwers
Danish male artistic gymnasts
Danish male sport shooters
ISSF rifle shooters
Danish male weightlifters
Olympic gold medalists for Denmark
Olympic silver medalists for Denmark
Olympic bronze medalists for Denmark
Olympic medalists in weightlifting
Olympic medalists in shooting
Medalists at the 1896 Summer Olympics
People associated with physical culture
Sportspeople from Copenhagen